The Critic is an American animated TV series 1994–1995.

The Critic may also refer to:
 The Critic (play), a 1779 satire by Richard Brinsley Sheridan
 The Critic (1963 film), a short animation by Ernest Pintoff and Mel Brooks
 The Critic (2019 film), an American psychological thriller short film
 The Critic (upcoming film), an upcoming British period thriller film
 "The Critic", a 2003 song by Toby Keith from Shock'n Y'all
 The titular character of the comedy film criticism webseries Nostalgia Critic.

Magazines 
 The Critic (modern magazine), a British monthly magazine founded in 2019
The Critic (Victorian magazine), a London publication of the mid 19th-century
The Critic (New York)
The Critic (Adelaide) (1897–1924), a defunct South Australian weekly magazine

See also
Critic (disambiguation)